The 1991 Dallas Cowboys season was the franchise's 32nd season in the National Football League (NFL) and was the third year of the franchise under the ownership of Jerry Jones and head coach Jimmy Johnson. This also marked Norv Turner's first year as offensive coordinator under head coach Jimmy Johnson. The Cowboys improved on their 7–9 record from 1990, finishing 11–5, and made the playoffs for the first time since 1985.

The young offensive nucleus of what soon became known as “The Triplets,”—Troy Aikman, Michael Irvin and Emmitt Smith—continued to develop, as did the offensive line, while the defense also improved. Though the Cowboys would lose in the playoffs to the Detroit Lions in the divisional round, the season was considered a resounding success, and a glimpse of things to come. Notable additions to the team this year include defensive tackle Russell Maryland, wide receiver Alvin Harper, offensive tackle Erik Williams, linebacker Darrick Brownlow, cornerback Larry Brown and linebacker Dixon Edwards.

NFL Draft

Regular season
The season began with a strong 26–14 victory over Cleveland and a close Monday night loss to Washington, 33–31.  However, in Week Three the Cowboys were defeated at home by Philadelphia, 24–0. The Eagles sacked Troy Aikman eleven times, limited the Cowboys to just 90 yards of offense, and served notice that the Cowboys were still behind the "contenders" in the NFC East. 

A narrow victory the next week over the Cardinals did little to change that contention.   However, in Week 5, the Cowboys scored on a 23-yard touchdown to Michael Irvin and upset the defending Super Bowl champion Giants 21–16 (snapping a 6-game losing streak to the Giants). 

The momentum from the Giants win carried the Cowboys to three wins in the next four games, besting the slumping Packers and winless  Bengals.  After a turnover-plagued humiliation at Detroit, the Cowboys manhandled the Cardinals again and now stood at 6–3. 

But then the Cowboys lost to the Oilers in overtime (the Cowboys were driving close to field goal range in the overtime period when Emmitt Smith committed a rare fumble). The next week, they lost at the Giants in a game Jimmy Johnson said was "officiated as poorly" as any he had ever coached in. 

At 6–5, the playoff chances seemed in serious jeopardy, especially with their upcoming opponent being a road game against the undefeated (and eventual Super bowl champion) Washington Redskins. However, Jimmy Johnson presented a gambling game plan for the Redskins game, including a first-half onside kick, several decisions to "go for it" on 4th down at unusual times, and opting to throw for the end zone on the final play of the first half even though the team was within field goal range at the Redskins' 34-yard line. Alvin Harper made the catch for a TD. The gambling game plan worked and the Cowboys completed a titanic 24–21 upset of the Redskins. Troy Aikman was injured in the Redskins game and was replaced early in the 2nd half by Steve Beuerlein (who had been signed late in the pre-season so as to avoid the problems at backup QB that plagued the Cowboys late in the 1990 season).

Aikman's injury was serious enough for him to miss the rest of the regular season. After the Washington win, Beuerlein led the Cowboys to four straight victories to end the season.  In Dallas's final game against Chuck Noll, the Cowboys defeated the Steelers 20–10, then defeated Dallas's former starter Steve Walsh and the Saints 23–14. The Eagles were downed 25–13 and then the Cowboys edged the Falcons 31–27; Jimmy Johnson, fearing complacency in his young players, called a snap full pads practice in driving rain the Friday before. 

The Cowboys' 11–5 record was good enough to earn a wildcard playoff berth. In most of the games, the Beuerlein-led offense was limited in passing yardage but the passing offense avoided serious mistakes and was helped by strong defensive performances and by Emmitt Smith, who finished the season with his first NFL rushing title. The biggest win of the Cowboys' late-season streak was a 25–13 win road win over the Philadelphia Eagles. It snapped a 7-game losing streak to the Eagles in "non-replacement games" and avenged the 24–0 loss back in week 3. In fairness, the Eagles were down to their third quarterback for this game (starter Randall Cunningham was lost for the season in week 1 and Jim McMahon, who had led the Eagles to their earlier win over Dallas, was also injured, leaving the reins to Jeff Kemp).

The special teams coached by Joe Avezzano were a strength of the Cowboys:
 Dallas led the NFC in special teams effectiveness and ranked second in the NFL behind the Los Angeles Raiders.
 It led the league in special teams touchdowns (3) and average kickoff return (21.7 yards).
 The Cowboys placed a player in the top three in the NFL in both punt and kickoff return averages in the same season for the first time in team history. In addition, Alexander Wright's 102 yard kickoff return against the Atlanta Falcons and Kelvin Martin's 85 yard punt return against the Philadelphia Eagles were NFL season-bests. 
 Kicker Ken Willis tied a club record with 27 field goals and set another with four 50-yarders.
 Punter Mike Saxon finished tied for fourth in the NFL with a career best 36.8 yard net average.
 Blocked three punts, returning one for a touchdown against the Houston Oilers.
 The special teams also recovered an onside kick against the Washington Redskins, forced a safety and recovered two punts fumbled by opponents.

Schedule

Note: Intra-division opponents are in bold text.

Playoffs

Standings

Playoffs
Amid making the playoffs for the first time since 1985, there was controversy at the quarterback position. Troy Aikman was considered healthy enough to return for the playoffs. However, Beuerlein hadn't lost as a starter and there was an argument for "riding the hot hand". The "hot hand" argument won and Jimmy Johnson made the decision to play Beuerlein in the wildcard playoff game against the Chicago Bears, and the Cowboys won a hard-fought 17–13 decision at Soldier Field. It was the team's first playoff win since 1982 and first road playoff win since 1980.

After the Chicago win, some thought the Cowboys were Super Bowl contenders (since they had beaten the NFC favorite Redskins at RFK Stadium during the regular season, there was a belief they could do it again if they met the Redskins in the NFC Championship game). However, the Cowboys would first have to beat Detroit at the Silverdome, where the Lions had not lost in 1991.

Heading into the Detroit game, the QB controversy continued as the Cowboys prepared for their divisional playoff game. Pressure was mounting to return Aikman to the lineup but Beuerlein was announced as the starter. Beuerlein started but Aikman would replace him late in the first half with the Cowboys trailing 17–6. The other main issue in the Detroit game was stopping the Lions' running back Barry Sanders, one of the great players in the NFL. When the game began, the Cowboys defense did an excellent job stopping Sanders, holding him to one of his lowest outputs of the season. However, the Cowboys were torched by unheralded Lions quarterback Erik Kramer through the air, resulting in the final score being 38–6 in favor of Detroit.

NFC Wild Card

NFC Divisional Playoff

Roster

Publications
 The Football Encyclopedia 
 Total Football 
 Cowboys Have Always Been My Heroes

References

External links
 1991 Dallas Cowboys
 Pro Football Hall of Fame
 Dallas Cowboys Official Site

Dallas Cowboys seasons
Dallas
Dallas